The Constant Woman (1933), also known as Auction in Souls and Hell in a Circus, is an American Pre-Code film directed by Victor Schertzinger. It is based on the 1913 Eugene O'Neill play Recklessness.

Plot
Marlene Underwood is a star circus performer, whose husband Walt buys the circus while their son Jimmie worships everything his mother does. Marlene leaves them both to go join a larger show, then is killed in a fire, resulting in Walt going into a downward spiral of alcohol and sorrow.

A woman called Lou helps restore Walt's faith in human nature, but she is resented by young Jimmie, who feels she is trying to take his mother's place. Walt gets back on his feet, but now must try to stop Jimmie from joining the circus himself.

Cast
Conrad Nagel as Walt Underwood
Leila Hyams as Lou
Tommy Conlon as Jimmie Underwood
Claire Windsor as Marlene Underwood
Stanley Fields as "Beef"
Fred Kohler as Bouncer
Alexander Carr as J.J. Brock
Robert Ellis as Leading Man
Lionel Belmore as Character Man
Ruth Clifford as Floozie

External links 
 

1933 films
1933 romantic drama films
American black-and-white films
American films based on plays
Films based on works by Eugene O'Neill
American romantic drama films
Films directed by Victor Schertzinger
Circus films
Films with screenplays by F. Hugh Herbert
1930s American films